Fremont High School is an urban public high school located in East Oakland, California, United States.  It was formerly a group of smaller high schools located on the same campus and known as Fremont Federation of High Schools.  The school's present configuration is that of the "wall to wall" career academies model, consisting of a 9th Grade House which feeds into one of two California Partnership Academies (CPA), specifically the Architecture Academy and the Media Academy.

History

Fremont High is part of the Oakland Unified School District, and located at 4610 Foothill Boulevard since 1905. A fire in 1930 destroyed much of the original campus, which was rebuilt. Most of those buildings, in turn, were renovated, with some structures demolished and rebuilt, during the mid-to-late 1970s as part of a statewide program of retrofitting schools for earthquake safety.

The school was split into four smaller autonomous schools in 2003:

 College Preparatory and Architecture Academy
 Mandela High School
 Media College Preparatory High School
 Paul Robeson School, Visual and Performing Arts  (closed after the 2009–2010 school year)

The three high schools remained and had their own administration until the spring of 2011. They functioned separately, though located on the same campus, and used the same library. They also had common sports teams under the Fremont High School banner.

After the spring of 2011, as part of an Oakland Unified School District decision to slowly reverse the small school system, the three remaining schools became less autonomous. The 2011–2012 school year reintroduced a central administration with three separate entities and budgets on campus: Mandela High, Media High, and CPAA. In 2012, the Fremont Federation of High Schools again became Fremont High School, with one single administration.

A major project to revamp the school’s campus, started in 2018 and completed in 2020, added an academic building, a football field with grandstands, a gymnasium, and a new front entrance to the school. The $133 million project—largely funded by local bond measure, Measure J—also included renovation to an academic building and addressing sustainability through bioretention planters, additional windows and skylights for more natural lighting, and a pair of electric vehicle chargers.

2020-2021 student profile
 927 students:

Courses offered

Fremont High School offers several advanced placement (AP) courses, including:
AP Calculus AB
AP Biology
AP World History
AP United States History
AP United States Government
AP English Literature
AP English Language
AP Spanish

Fremont High also offers academy-based courses, including:
Woodworking A/B
Architecture Design/Drafting
Video Production
Media Studies
Journalism
Graphic Design
Model UN classes

Test scores
California's API scores are on a scale of 200–1000, with a statewide median around 750. In 2009, Fremont Federation's schools received the following scores:

 Mandela High School: 528
 Media College Prep. High School: 519
 Robeson Visual and Performing Arts High School: 483

In 2010, Fremont Federation of High Schools received the following scores:

 Mandela High School: 538
 Media College Prep. High School: 619
 College Preparatory and Architecture Academy: 604

CAHSEE test scores:
 Passing ELA (English Language Arts):51%
 Passing Math: 46%

Notable alumni
 Florence Wysinger Allen, artist's model
Joanne Beretta, cabaret singer
 Bill Brenzel, former professional baseball player (Pittsburgh Pirates, Cleveland Indians)
 Lester Conner, professional basketball player and coach
 Darrell J. Doughty, biblical scholar
 Robert Harvey (literary theorist), philosopher, professor.
 Ken Hofmann, real estate developer and former co-owner of the Oakland Athletics and Seattle Seahawks
 Steve Hosey, major league baseball player
 Garry Jestadt, former professional baseball player (Montreal Expos, Chicago Cubs, San Diego Padres)
 Sten Odenwald, astronomer
 Donald G. Reed, actor and comedian
 Ade Schwammel, professional football player
 Bob Smith, former professional baseball player (Tampa Bay Rays)
 Too Short, Oakland rapper
 Henry Turner, professional basketball player
 Ken Walters, former professional baseball player (Philadelphia Phillies, Cincinnati Reds)
 Keyshia Cole, R&B singer

References

External links

 Oakland Unified School District website
 Fremont High School homepage

High schools in Oakland, California
Educational institutions established in 1905
Public high schools in California
Small schools movement
1905 establishments in California
Oakland Unified School District